Charles Joseph Clark  (born June 5, 1939) is a Canadian businessman, writer, and politician who served as the 16th prime minister of Canada from 1979 to 1980.

Despite his relative inexperience, Clark rose quickly in federal politics, entering the House of Commons in the 1972 election and winning the leadership of the Progressive Conservative Party in 1976. He won a minority government in the 1979 election, defeating the Liberal government of Pierre Trudeau and ending sixteen years of continuous Liberal rule. Taking office the day before his 40th birthday, Clark is the youngest person to become Prime Minister.

Clark's tenure was brief as the minority government was brought down by a non-confidence vote on his first budget in December 1979. The budget defeat triggered the 1980 election. Clark and the Progressive Conservatives lost the election to Trudeau and the Liberals, who won a majority in the Commons and returned to power. Clark lost the leadership of the party to Brian Mulroney in 1983.

Clark returned to prominence in 1984 as a senior cabinet minister in Mulroney's cabinet, retiring from politics after not standing for re-election for the House of Commons in 1993. He made a political comeback in 1998 to lead the Progressive Conservatives in their last stand before the party's eventual dissolution, serving his final term in Parliament from 2000 to 2004. After the Progressive Conservatives merged with the more right-wing Canadian Alliance to form the modern-day Conservative Party of Canada in 2003, Clark instead sat as an independent Progressive Conservative, criticizing the merger as what he described as an "Alliance take-over", believing that the new party was drifting towards social conservatism. Clark today serves as a university professor and as president of his own consulting firm.

Early years

Charles Joseph Clark was born in High River, Alberta, the son of Grace Roselyn (née Welch) and local newspaper publisher Charles A. Clark.

Clark attended local schools and the University of Alberta, where he earned a bachelor's degree in history (1960) and a master's degree in political science (1973). While in high school, he gained journalism experience with the High River Times and the Calgary Albertan. In his first year at the University of Alberta, Clark joined the staff of the campus newspaper, The Gateway, and eventually became its editor-in-chief. Clark was also a member of the University of Alberta Debate Society (UADS). He later worked one summer at the Edmonton Journal where he met his future biographer, David L. Humphreys. 

Clark then attended Dalhousie Law School.  However, he spent more time with the Dalhousie Student Union, Progressive Conservative politics and the Dalhousie Gazette, than on his courses.  After leaving Dalhousie, he unsuccessfully pursued first-year law studies at the University of British Columbia Faculty of Law in Vancouver. He then worked full-time for the Progressive Conservative Party.

In 1973, Clark married law student Maureen McTeer. McTeer has developed her own career as a well-known author and lawyer and caused controversy by keeping her maiden name after marriage, a practice less common at the time. Their daughter, Catherine has pursued a career in public relations and broadcasting.

Early political career
Clark became politically active while at university, although he had been aware from a young age of politics in Canada. He competed with the University of Alberta Debate Society. He served as president of the University of Alberta Young Progressive Conservatives and eventually served as national president for the Young PCs group. Clark sparred with future political rival Preston Manning in debate forums on campus between the Young PCs and the Youth League of the Alberta Social Credit Party. Clark encountered another future rival when he met Brian Mulroney at a national Young PCs meeting in 1958.

Clark spent time in France to improve his fluency in the French language and took courses in French while he was living in Ottawa. He eventually became comfortable speaking and answering questions in French.

Clark entered politics at age 28 but was unsuccessful as candidate for the provincial Progressive Conservatives in the 1967 provincial election. He served as a chief assistant to provincial opposition leader and future Premier Peter Lougheed and served in the office of federal opposition leader Robert Stanfield, learning the inner workings of Parliament. Clark unsuccessfully ran for the Legislative Assembly of Alberta in the 1971 provincial election. He then successfully ran in the federal election held a year later and was elected to Parliament as the MP for Rocky Mountain, a largely rural riding in southwestern Alberta.

Clark's social liberalism put him at odds with the right-wing members of his caucus, several of whom were not afraid to confront him. For example, in the lead-up to the 1979 election, the bulk of Clark's riding was merged into the newly created riding of Bow River during a redistribution of ridings.  Fellow Tory MP Stanley Schumacher had much of his old riding of Palliser merged into Bow River as well.  Even though Clark was now party leader, Schumacher refused to step aside in Clark's favour, forcing Clark to run in nearby Yellowhead.

Progressive Conservative leadership convention, 1976
Following the resignation of PC party leader Robert Stanfield, Clark sought and won the leadership of the PC Party at the 1976 leadership convention. Initially, the favourite among Red Tories was Flora MacDonald; however, she did worse than expected, while Clark placed a surprising third in a field of eleven on the first ballot of convention delegates, behind only Claude Wagner and Brian Mulroney. MacDonald dropped off after the second ballot, encouraging her supporters to support Clark, who quickly became the compromise Red Tory candidate. The party's right-wing rallied behind Wagner. Mulroney, a Quebec businessman with no elected political experience, was unable to expand his base of support significantly. As other Red Tory candidates were eliminated during the first four ballots, Clark gradually overtook Mulroney and then Wagner to emerge as the victor on the fourth ballot, by 1,187 votes to 1,122.

Clark, who won the Tory leadership at age 36, remains the youngest leader of a major federal party in the history of Canadian politics. With many veteran Tories having been defeated in the 1968 election, the party effectively skipped a generation by selecting Clark as its new leader.

Opposition Leader, 1976–1979
Joe Clark's rapid rise from a relatively unknown Alberta MP to the Leader of the Opposition took much of Canada by surprise. The Toronto Star announced Clark's victory with a headline that read "Joe Who?", giving Clark a nickname that stuck for years. His clumsiness and awkward mannerisms were mocked by some political commentators, such as cartoonist Andy Donato who typically drew Clark with mittens on strings hanging from his suit sleeves.

However, Clark hired experienced staffers such as Lowell Murray, Duncan Edmonds, and William Neville, who shaped his policies and ran his office. He improved his party's standing in national opinion polls. Clark gradually earned the respect of some political observers, including his own caucus, and benefited when live television came to the House of Commons in 1977. Some observers noted that Clark, despite being perceived by many people as something of a square, showed biting wit at times while in Opposition. One of his most famous quips was: "A recession is when your neighbour loses his job. A depression is when you lose your job. Recovery is when Pierre Trudeau loses his job."

1979 election

Large budget deficits, high inflation, and high unemployment made the Liberal government unpopular. Trudeau had put off asking the Canadian Governor General to call an election as long as possible, in the hope that his party could recover popular support but it backfired, as there was growing public antipathy towards his perceived arrogance. Clark campaigned on the slogans, "Let's get Canada working again", and "It's time for a change—give the future a chance!"

In the latter half of the campaign, the Liberals focused their attacks on Clark's perceived inexperience. Their advertisements declared "This is no time for on-the-job training", and "We need tough leadership to keep Canada growing. A leader must be a leader." Clark played into their hands by appearing bumbling and unsure in public.

When Clark undertook a tour of the Middle East in order to show his ability to handle foreign affairs issues, his luggage was lost, and Clark appeared to be uncomfortable with the issues being discussed. That incident was widely lampooned by Toronto Sun cartoonist Andy Donato. During the same tour, while inspecting a military honour guard, Clark turned too soon and nearly bumped into a soldier's bayonet; one of the first major media reports on the incident claimed, with some exaggeration, that he had nearly been beheaded.

Despite Clark being bilingual, the Tories were unable to make much headway in Quebec, which continued to be federally dominated by the Liberals. While Clark's 1976 leadership rivals were prominent in that province, Claude Wagner had left politics (he died shortly after the election), while Brian Mulroney was still bitter about his loss and turned down an offer to serve under Clark.

Nonetheless, Clark's Progressive Conservatives won 136 seats to end sixteen continuous years of Liberal rule. Despite receiving less votes than the Liberals nationally, the Progressive Conservatives won the popular vote in seven provinces.  They also made huge gains in Ontario, particularly in the Toronto suburbs.  However, they were only able to win two seats in Quebec, leaving them six seats short of a majority.  The Liberals lost 27 seats, including several high-profile cabinet ministers, and Trudeau announced his intention to step down as party leader.

Prime minister (1979–1980)

On June 4, 1979, the day before his 40th birthday, Clark was sworn in as Canada's youngest prime minister, steering the first Tory government since the defeat of John Diefenbaker in the 1963 election.

With a minority government in the House of Commons, Clark had to rely on the support of the Social Credit Party, with its six seats, or the New Democratic Party (NDP), with its 26 seats. At the time, Opposition leader Trudeau said that he would allow the Progressive Conservatives a chance to govern, though he warned the Prime Minister against dismantling Petro-Canada, which was unpopular in Clark's home province of Alberta.

Social Credit was below the 12 seats needed for official party status in the House of Commons. However, the six seats would have been just enough to give Clark's government a majority had the Progressive Conservatives formed a coalition government with Social Credit, or had the two parties otherwise agreed to work together. Clark managed to lure Socred MP Richard Janelle to the government caucus, but this still left the Tories five seats short of a majority. Clark however decided that he would govern as if he had a majority, and refused to grant the small Socred official party status, form a coalition, or co-operate with the party in any way.

Clark was unable to accomplish much in office because of the tenuous situation of his minority government. However, historians have credited Clark's government with making access to information legislation a priority. The Clark government introduced Bill C-15, the Freedom of Information Act, which established a broad right of access to government records, an elaborate scheme of exemptions, and a two-stage review process. The legislation was debated at second reading at the end of November 1979 and was referred to the Standing Committee on Justice and Legal Affairs. Within days the minority Conservative government was unseated; the legislation died on the order paper. The re-elected Trudeau government subsequently based its Access to Information Act on the Clark government's Bill C-15. The Access to Information Act received royal assent in July 1982 and came into force in July 1983. The public now has the legal right of access to government records in some 150 federal departments and agencies.

Though the election had been held in May, Parliament did not resume sitting until October, one of the longest break periods in Confederation. The gas tax in the budget soured Clark's relationship with Ontario Premier Bill Davis, even though both were Red Tories. Even before the budget, the government was criticized for its perceived inexperience, such as in its handling of its campaign commitment to move Canada's embassy in Israel from Tel Aviv to Jerusalem.

Internationally, Clark represented Canada in June 1979 at the 5th G7 summit in Tokyo. Clark reportedly had a good relationship with US President Jimmy Carter, who phoned Clark to thank him personally for his role in the Canadian Caper.

Fall of government
During the 1979 election campaign, Clark had promised to cut taxes to stimulate the economy. However, once in office, the 1979 budget he proposed was designed to curb inflation by slowing economic activity. The budget also proposed a 4-cent per litre (18-cent per gallon) tax on gasoline in order to reduce the budgetary deficit. Finance Minister John Crosbie touted the budget as "short term pain for long term gain". Though Clark had hoped this change in policy would work to his advantage, it actually earned him widespread animosity as a politician who could not keep his promises, even in such a short period.

Clark's refusal to work with the Socreds, combined with the gasoline tax, came back to haunt him when the budget came before the House of Commons in December 1979.  On December 13, NDP Finance Critic Bob Rae proposed a subamendment to the budget motion, stating that the House of Commons did not approve of the budget. The Liberals supported the NDP subamendment. The five Socred MPs had demanded the gas tax revenues be allocated to Quebec and abstained when Clark turned them down. As a result, the subamendment passed on a 139–133 margin.

Clark was criticized for his "inability to do math" in failing to predict the outcome, not only because he was in a minority situation, but also because three members of his caucus would be absent for the crucial budget vote. One was ill and two were stuck abroad on official business. The Liberals by contrast had assembled their entire caucus, save one, for the occasion.

1980 election
The vote on Rae's amendment was partially welcomed by Clark and the Tories. When a new election was called, Clark expected his party would be able to defeat the demoralized and leaderless Liberals easily, since Trudeau had announced his intention to step aside and the Liberals had yet to hold a leadership convention. However, the Progressive Conservatives had misjudged the electorate, since they had not commissioned any polls since August. A November Gallup poll published eight days before the December 11 budget reported that their popularity was down from 36% during the summer to 28%, with the party 19 points behind the Liberals, giving the latter the popular support to initiate the non-confidence motion. After the government fell, Clark's party was caught off guard when Pierre Trudeau quickly rescinded his resignation from the Liberal leadership to lead his party into the subsequent election.

Clark's Tories campaigned under the slogan, "Real change deserves a fair chance." Trudeau swept the Liberals back into power in the February 1980 election with 147 seats, against 103 for the Progressive Conservatives. Davis' criticism of the gas tax was used in the Liberals' Ontario television ads. The Tories lost 19 seats in that province, which ultimately proved to be decisive in the campaign.

Clark's government would last a total of nine months less a day.  As Clark's Finance Minister, John Crosbie, famously described it in his own inimitable way: "Long enough to conceive, just not long enough to deliver."

Supreme Court appointments
Clark chose Julien Chouinard to be appointed as a justice of the Supreme Court of Canada by the Governor General, who served from September 24, 1979, to February 6, 1987.

Relationship between Trudeau and Clark
Trudeau commented in his memoirs, published in 1993, that Clark was much more tough and aggressive than past Tory leader Robert Stanfield, noting that those qualities served Clark well in his party winning the 1979 election victory. Trudeau also complimented Clark as a respectable leader and a better choice over Brian Mulroney, who had defeated Clark at the leadership convention in 1983. Trudeau told his friends that the Tories had chosen the wrong man.

Opposition leader, 1980–1983
Opposition to Clark's leadership began to grow after the fall of the PC minority government, and the party's defeat by a resurgent Liberal Party. There were frequent rumors that several potential challengers were covertly undermining Clark's leadership. Though in 1982 Brian Mulroney deliberately appeared at a press conference with Clark to say that he was not seeking the leadership of the PC party, he was in fact conspiring to oust Clark.

The Liberal Party had regained national prominence by leading the "No" side to victory in the 1980 Quebec referendum and the Constitution patriation. While Trudeau's National Energy Program was hugely unpopular in Western Canada, especially Alberta, it was able to shore up Liberal support in the voter-rich Eastern Canada, particularly Ontario and Quebec, generally having the opposite effect of Clark's proposed gas tax. Difficult budgets and the economic recession resulted in Trudeau's approval ratings declining after the bounce from the 1982 Constitution patriation and showed his party headed for certain defeat by early 1984, prompting him to retire. However, Clark was unable to stay on as Progressive Conservative leader long enough to regain the Prime Ministership.

On 28 February 1981, during the party's national convention, 33.5% of the delegates supported a leadership review; they felt that Clark would not be able to lead the party to victory again but Clark considered two thirds of delegates voting no to be an endorsement. At the January 1983 convention in Winnipeg, 33.1% supported a review. This was also considering that the governing Liberals under Pierre Trudeau were slipping in polls, and although the PCs had built up a substantial lead in popularity, Trudeau was expected to retire before the election and a new Liberal leader could have been able to pull off a victory.

1983 leadership convention
In 1983, after declaring that an endorsement by 66.9% of delegates at the party's biennial convention was not enough, Clark called a leadership convention to decide the issue. (In December 2007, German-Canadian businessman and lobbyist Karlheinz Schreiber told the House of Commons Ethics Committee that he and other Germans, including Bavarian politician Franz Josef Strauss, and Austrian-Canadian entrepreneur Walter Wolf, had contributed significant funds to finance Quebec delegates to vote against Clark at Winnipeg, denying him the mandate he sought. A public inquiry on these matters, and on other business dealings between Mulroney and Schreiber, was called for early 2008 by Prime Minister Stephen Harper. This led further to the 2009 Oliphant Commission.

Clark immediately nominated to keep his leader's post, and retained support from most of the Red Tories and other party members who were opposed to the public attacks on his leadership by others in the party. Clark already had most of a campaign team up and running by the time he called the leadership convention, as he had mobilized support to help gain in the convention's leadership review. However, Mulroney and John Crosbie had been laying the groundwork for a campaign for some time, with Crosbie expecting Clark to lose or resign soon, and Mulroney supportive of the anti-Clark movement.

In a rematch of the 1976 convention, Mulroney emerged as the main challenger, gaining the support of the party's right wing, which viewed Clark as too progressive and opposed his continued leadership. Other party members felt that the federal Liberal Party's stranglehold on Quebec seats (they held all but one of the province's 75 seats) could only be broken by a native from that province, which gave Mulroney considerable support. Media coverage emphasized the pro-business and neo-liberal bent of most of the candidates as a "Changing of the Guard" within the PC party from their more classical conservative and moderate elements. Clark's campaign countered this by trying to polarize the election between right wingers and a centrist who had been able to win before. The Mulroney campaign responded by continuing their pro-business line.

Several candidates agreed to an "ABC" (Anybody But Clark) strategy for the convention and when news of that back-room deal broke out, support was expected to rally around the party's embattled leader. During delegate voting, Clark won the first ballot, but only won 36.5% of the vote, well short of the 50% required. His support dwindled over the next two ballots. Mulroney, who was endorsed by all but two candidates, defeated Clark on the fourth ballot. Clark urged his supporters to leave the convention united behind Mulroney, and agreed to serve under him.

Many political observers and analysts have questioned Clark's rationale for the decision. One famous incident involved a 1987 official dinner held for Prince Charles at Rideau Hall. When the Prince met Clark in the receiving line at the function, he asked to Clark: "why wasn't two thirds enough?" Clark's wife, Maureen McTeer, elaborated on Clark's decision in her 2003 autobiography, In My Own Name. McTeer suggested that for her husband, anything less than a 75% endorsement would not have been a clear enough mandate to forge onwards from the party membership. Clark feared that the 34% of PC members who did not support him would become his most vocal critics in the upcoming election campaign, and that his continued leadership would have led to fractures in the party. Clark was convinced that he could win another leadership race and gain a clear level of support, once his qualities were compared against the handful of politically inexperienced challengers who coveted his position and who were covertly undermining his leadership.

Member of Mulroney cabinet

Secretary of State for External Affairs (Minister of Foreign Affairs)

The Progressive Conservatives, led by Mulroney, went on to win a huge victory in the 1984 election, and Mulroney became prime minister.

Despite their personal differences, Clark ably served in Mulroney's cabinet as the Secretary of State for External Affairs, as the Minister of Foreign Affairs was known before 1993.  Along with Arthur Meighen, Clark is one of two former Prime Ministers who have returned to prominent roles in Parliament.

Some of Clark's accomplishments and bold moves in this role included:
convincing Mulroney to recommend the appointment of Stephen Lewis as Canada's ambassador to the United Nations – who later became the UN special envoy on the AIDS crisis; many believe Lewis' appointment was Clark's price to serve under Mulroney;
in 1984, being the very first developed nation foreign affairs minister to land in previously-isolated Ethiopia to lead the Western response to the 1983–1985 famine in Ethiopia; Canada's response was overwhelming, and led the United States and Great Britain to follow suit almost immediately – an unprecedented situation in foreign affairs to that time, since Ethiopia had a Marxist one-party state and had previously been wholly isolated by "the West";
taking a strong stand against apartheid and for economic sanctions against South Africa at a time when Canadian allies Ronald Reagan and Margaret Thatcher opposed such sanctions;
taking a strong stand against American intervention in Nicaragua;
accepting refugees from El Salvador and Guatemala;
managing nonetheless to maintain extremely strong ties with the US, helping steer the North American Free Trade Agreement negotiations to a final agreement.

During his term as External Affairs minister, Clark championed Canada's unabashed disapproval of the apartheid regime in South Africa. Canada was the only G7 nation to take such a resolute stance against the apartheid regime during the 1980s. He also took on the difficult Constitution ministerial portfolio after the failure of the Meech Lake Accord, and vigorously pursued his task.

He maintained Canada's independent voice politically and socially at a time of increasing economic integration with the US and the rise of more socially conservative right-wing politics there.

Minister responsible for Constitutional Affairs

Clark later served as the President of the Queen's Privy Council for Canada.

With Quebec's constitutional status within Canada a rising issue, he shifted to become the Minister responsible for Constitutional Affairs. The latter position saw him play a leading role in the drafting of the Charlottetown Accord, which was decisively rejected in a nationwide referendum and further hurt the standing of the PC party in polls.

First retirement from Canadian politics
He retired from politics in 1993, side-stepping the near annihilation of the PC party in the 1993 election under the leadership of Mulroney's successor Kim Campbell.

Clark was appointed as Special Representative to the Secretary-General of the United Nations for Cyprus from 1993 to 1996. In 1993, he founded his own consulting firm, Joe Clark and Associates, Ltd., which he still heads. Clark has also served on the boards of directors or advisory boards of several Canadian companies.

During the 1993–1994 academic year, Clark served as a Regents' Lecturer in the Canadian Studies Program at the University of California, Berkeley.

In 1994, he was made a Companion of the Order of Canada. Also in 1994, he wrote the book A Nation Too Good to Lose: Renewing the Purpose of Canada. This book was also published in a French translation.

The 1995 Quebec referendum saw the federal side win by less than one percent of the vote. It was widely seen as being the failure of the Charlottetown and prior Meech Lake accords that had caused it to be so close.

Progressive Conservative leadership, 1998–2003
One of the two PC candidates to survive the 1993 wipe-out, Jean Charest, became leader of the PC party following Campbell's resignation. After leading the party to a modest resurgence in the 1997 election, winning 20 seats, Charest bowed to tremendous public pressure and left federal politics to become leader of the Quebec Liberal Party (unaffiliated with the federal Liberals). The party had no obvious candidate to fill Charest's shoes, and turned to Clark once again in 1998.  He was elected by a teleconference of PC members from around the country in which each of the party's riding associations was allocated 100 points. The points for each riding were then assigned on the basis of each candidate's share of votes within each riding association. Clark defeated Hugh Segal, free-trade opponent David Orchard, former Manitoba cabinet minister Brian Pallister, and future Senator Michael Fortier for the leadership of the PC Party.

It took two years for Clark to return to Parliament.  He was elected for Kings—Hants, Nova Scotia, in a by-election on September 11, 2000, after the incumbent MP, Scott Brison, stood down in his favour.  This is common practice when a newly elected party leader does not already have a seat in Parliament.  For the general election held two months later, Clark yielded Kings-Hants back to Brison and was elected as the MP for Calgary Centre, by then deep in the heart of Canadian Alliance territory.

Clark ran on his previous experience as Prime Minister and External Affairs Minister. However, he faced a difficult task, with critics and opponents attacking him and the PC Party as a "vote for the past". Jean Chrétien's governing Liberals were running on their successful economic record, and they were poised to regain the support that they lost in 1997, threatening the PC's 1997 gains in Ontario, Quebec, and the Atlantic provinces. The PC party lost ground in Quebec (due in part to the departure of Jean Charest to provincial politics), which resulted in three members of the PC caucus defecting to join the Liberal Party prior to the election. However, Clark was judged by audiences to be the best speaker during the 2000 election debates. The party lost seats to the Liberals, though it managed to hang onto the minimum 12 seats necessary to be recognized in the House of Commons as an official party and therefore qualify for research funding, committee memberships, and minimum speaking privileges. Aside from Clark's Calgary seat (one of only three Alberta seats that did not go to the Canadian Alliance), and one each in Manitoba and Quebec, the party's seats were concentrated in Tory bastions in the Atlantic provinces.  Clark continually promoted the idea that the PCs would eventually retake Ontario and form a federal government again. His vision for the party was one that was to the left of the Alliance, but to the right of the Liberals.

He soon realized that there was no chance of dislodging the Liberals as long as the centre-right remained split.  However, he wanted a merger on his terms.  He got his chance in 2001, when several dissident Alliance MPs, the most prominent one being Alliance deputy leader and party matriarch Deborah Grey, left the Alliance caucus. The dissidents felt that Alliance leader Stockwell Day had not learned from mistakes made in the last election. While some of them rejoined the Alliance later, seven of them, led by Chuck Strahl of British Columbia and including Grey, refused and formed the Democratic Representative Caucus. The DRC quickly formed a joint caucus with the Tories with Clark as leader.

This lasted until 2002, when Stephen Harper ousted Day as Alliance leader. Harper wanted a closer union with the PCs, but Clark turned the offer down in April 2002, and all but two of the DRC members rejoined the Alliance. One of the two, Inky Mark, eventually joined the PCs. Two by-election victories later in 2002 increased the PC caucus to 15 members and fourth place in the Commons.

Clark was selected by the media and many parliamentarians for three years in a row to be Canada's most effective opposition leader between 2000 and 2002, pursuing the Liberal government on issues such as Shawinigate and the Groupaction scandal. In his final mandate, Jean Chrétien repeatedly referred to Clark as the Leader of the Opposition (Clark was not), much to the chagrin of the Canadian Alliance politicians who occupied the Opposition Leader's chair during the same period. Indeed, Chrétien and Clark had been fellow parliamentarians since the 1970s and they shared a mutual respect despite sitting on opposite benches.

Clark's personal popularity grew as, once again, scandal enveloped Chrétien's Liberal government. Clark was widely trusted by Canadians, but this, in his own words, did not translate into more votes and additional seats. Citing this, Clark announced his intention to step down as PC leader on August 6, 2002, at the PC Party's Edmonton policy convention. It was expected that a pro-Alliance merger candidate would succeed Clark, but Clark was instead replaced by Peter MacKay on May 31, 2003. MacKay had signed a controversial deal with Red Tory rival David Orchard, promising not to merge the PC Party with the Alliance. Clark had always encouraged MacKay to keep Orchard and his followers within the PC camp.

MacKay immediately reversed his position on seeking a merger, and in 2003, 90% of PC Party delegates voted in favor of a merger with the Canadian Alliance. Orchard unsuccessfully tried to block the merger and later joined the Liberal Party.

Legacy of second PC leadership
In May 2003, the party finally overtook the New Democratic Party as the fourth-largest party in the House of Commons, after by-election wins in Newfoundland and Labrador and Ontario.

At the same time, the party was still $10 million in debt from the 2000 election. The PC Party's membership had also dropped from 100,000 in 1998 to 45,000 card carrying PCs in May 2003. Clark's leadership of the Progressive Conservatives was also the subject of criticism from many United Alternative supporters, who argued that his staunch opposition to a merger with the Reform/Alliance parties helped divide the "conservative" vote during the tenure of Jean Chrétien. Some critics accused Clark of being more interested in helping the interests of his own party and own career than the Canadian conservative movement in general. Others attacked Clark's goal of the PC party regaining its former power as unrealistic.

Progressive Conservative–Canadian Alliance merger
On December 8, 2003, the day that the PC Party and the Canadian Alliance were dissolved and the new Conservative Party of Canada registered, Clark was one of three MPs—the other two were André Bachand and John Herron—to announce that they would not join the new caucus. MP Scott Brison had already joined the Liberals.

Clark announced that he would continue to sit for the remainder of the session as an independent Progressive Conservative MP, and retired from Parliament at the end of the session.

Later, Clark openly criticized the new Conservative Party in the run-up to the 2004 election. He gave a tepid endorsement to the Liberal Party in the 2004 election, calling Paul Martin "the devil we know". He criticized the new Conservative Party as an "Alliance take-over", and speculated that eastern Canada would not accept the new party or its more socially conservative policies against gay marriage and abortion. Clark endorsed former NDP leader Ed Broadbent and other Liberals and Conservatives as individuals, saying that the most important thing was to have "the strongest possible House of Commons of Canada" since neither large party offered much hope. Clark was criticized by some for dismissing the new Conservative Party outright rather than helping to steer it towards a moderate path.

Post-politics, 2004–present

Clark continues to apply his experience in foreign affairs. Clark served as Public Policy Scholar at the Woodrow Wilson International Center for Scholars. He served as Distinguished Statesman in Residence, School of International Service, and Senior Fellow, Center for North American Studies, both at the American University, Washington, D.C.  In addition to teaching classes at the American University in Washington, Clark has written several op-ed pieces for several of Canada's national newspapers since his retirement. In October 2006, Clark took a position at McGill University as a Professor of Practice for Public-Private Sector Partnerships at the McGill Institute for the Study of International Development. He serves with the Jimmy Carter Center, routinely travelling overseas as part of the centre's international observing activities.

Joe Clark is vice-chairman and a Member of the Global Leadership Foundation, an organization that works to support democratic leadership, prevent and resolve conflict through mediation and promote good governance in the form of democratic institutions, open markets, human rights and the rule of law. It does so by making available, discreetly and in confidence, the experience of former leaders to today's national leaders.  It is a not-for-profit organization composed of former heads of government, senior governmental and international organization officials who work closely with heads of government on governance-related issues of concern to them. He is also a member of Washington D.C. based think tank the Inter-American Dialogue.

Clark sat on the International Advisory Board of Governors of the Centre for International Governance Innovation, before 2012.

Clark was attacked while walking down the street in Montreal in mid-November 2007. The attacker first asked him if he was the former prime minister, and when Clark answered that he was, the man struck him and fled. Clark sustained a bloody nose but was not seriously hurt.

He published the book How We Lead: Canada in a Century of Change in 2013.

In March 2020, Prime Minister Justin Trudeau appointed Clark special envoy for Canada's bid for a UN Security Council seat.  Clark travelled to Algeria, Bahrain, Qatar and Egypt in an effort to seek votes for Canada.

Honours
100px

100px

105px

As a former prime minister, Clark is entitled to carry "The Right Honourable" designation for life. Clark was made a Companion of the Order of Canada. He is a member of the Alberta Order of Excellence. He was honoured as Commandeur de l'Ordre de la Pleiade from La Francophonie.  He also holds the Queen Elizabeth II Silver Jubilee Medal (1977), 125th Anniversary of the Confederation of Canada Medal (1992), Queen Elizabeth II Golden Jubilee Medal (2002), Queen Elizabeth II Diamond Jubilee Medal (2012) and the Alberta Centennial Medal (2005).  Clark was the first recipient of the Vimy Award. He is Honorary Chief Bald Eagle of the Samson Cree Nation.

In 2004, Clark's lifetime achievements were recognized with the Award for Excellence in the Cause of Parliamentary Democracy by Canada's Churchill Society for the Advancement of Parliamentary Democracy.

On Tuesday, May 27, 2008, Clark's official parliamentary portrait was unveiled during a reception ceremony to be hung in Centre Block alongside Canada's past prime ministers.

In a 1999 survey of Canadian historians Clark was ranked No. 15 out of the first 20 prime ministers through Jean Chrétien. The survey was used in the book Prime Ministers: Ranking Canada's Leaders by J. L. Granatstein and Norman Hillmer.

École Joe Clark School in High River, Alberta, is named in honour of Clark.

Order of Canada citation

Clark was appointed a Companion of the Order of Canada on October 19, 1994.  His citation reads:
Canada's sixteenth and youngest Prime Minister, he served with distinction as Secretary of State for External Affairs, President of the Privy Council and Minister responsible for Constitutional Affairs. His talent for negotiation and consensus diplomacy has served him well in politics and as Representative of the Secretary General of the United Nations in Cyprus. He has earned the admiration of all Canadians as one of our country's most respected statesmen.

Honorary degrees
Joe Clark has received honorary degrees from several institutions:

Arms

See also

 List of prime ministers of Canada

Explanatory notes

Citations

Further reading

Archives

Bibliography

 
 
 
 One-Eyed Kings, by Ron Graham, Toronto, 1986, Collins Publishers.
 The Insiders: Government, Business, and the Lobbyists, by John Sawatsky, 1987.
 Prime Ministers of Canada, by Jim Lotz, 1987.
 Mulroney: The Politics of Ambition, by John Sawatsky, Toronto, 1991, MacFarlane, Walter, and Ross Publishers.
 Memoirs, by Pierre Elliott Trudeau, Toronto, 1993, McClelland & Stewart Publishers, .
 Memoirs 1939–1993, by Brian Mulroney, 2007.

External links

 

1939 births
21st-century Canadian politicians
American University faculty and staff
Canadian corporate directors
Canadian diplomats
Canadian monarchists
Canadian non-fiction writers
Canadian Roman Catholics
Canadian Secretaries of State for External Affairs
Companions of the Order of Canada
Dalhousie University alumni
Leaders of the Opposition (Canada)
Living people
Members of the 21st Canadian Ministry
Members of the 24th Canadian Ministry
Members of the Alberta Order of Excellence
Members of the House of Commons of Canada from Alberta
Members of the House of Commons of Canada from Nova Scotia
Members of the Inter-American Dialogue
Members of the King's Privy Council for Canada
People from High River
Peter A. Allard School of Law alumni
Politicians from Calgary
Prime Ministers of Canada
University of Alberta alumni
Writers from Calgary